Zbrzyca may refer to:
Zbrzyca (river), Poland
Zbrzyca, Chojnice County, a village in Poland
Zbrzyca, Człuchów County, a village in Poland
Jan Zbrzyca, pen name of Stanisław Pestka

See also
Zbrza